Bardarash-e Sofla (also Romanized as Bardarash-e Soflá; also known as Jalālābād and Badarash-e Pā'īn) is a village in Aland Rural District, Safayyeh District, Khoy County, West Azerbaijan Province, Iran. At the 2006 census, its population was 199, in 30 families.

References 

Populated places in Khoy County